Węgrzynowice  is a village in the administrative district of Gmina Budziszewice, within Tomaszów Mazowiecki County, Łódź Voivodeship, in central Poland.

Węgrzynowice is famous as the birthplace of 17th-century szlachta soldier and writer Jan Chryzostom Pasek, who is said to have written his memoirs there. The place where his manor once stood is now occupied by an 18th-century wooden manor, surrounded by a romantic park.

References

Villages in Tomaszów Mazowiecki County